Franja may refer to:

 La Franja, the area of Catalan-speaking territories of eastern Aragon bordering Catalonia
 Franja Transversal del Norte, a region in Guatemala
 Antonio Franja (born 1978), Croatian footballer
 Ezmiralda Franja (born 1997), Albanian footballer
 Franja du Plessis (born 1994), Namibian singer

See also
 Democratic Convergence of La Franja, a political party in La Franja
 Franja de Gaza, Argentine band
 Franja Partisan Hospital, in Slovenia during World War II, now a museum